The Sujagi is a flag with a Hanja(帥), pronounced su in Korean, that denotes a commanding general.  The whole term literally means, "Commanding general flag".  Only one sujagi is known to exist in Korea.  The color is a faded yellowish-brown background with a black character in its center.  It is made of hemp cloth and measures approximately 4.15m x 4.35m.

History
This type of flag was put in a fortress where a commanding general was located.  In the case of the extant sujagi in Korea, it represented General Eo Jae-yeon who, in 1871, commanded the Korean military forces on Ganghwa Island, which is off the northwest coast of present-day South Korea, near the capital of Seoul. It was captured by the United States Asiatic Squadron in June of that year during the United States' expedition to Korea.  As with other war prizes, it was put into the collection of the museum at the United States Naval Academy in Annapolis, Maryland.

In October 2007, after many years of petitions by South Korea to the United States government, the flag was returned to South Korea on a long-term, ten-year loan.

After being returned, it was displayed at the National Palace Museum of Korea in Seoul until 2009, when it was moved to the Ganghwa History Museum on Ganghwa Island. As of September 2022, the lease had been renewed for the flag to stay in Korea until at least October 2023.

References

Notes

See also
History of Korea
Military history of Korea
Joseon Dynasty

External links
 Sujagi Flag Return

History of Korea
Flags of Korea
Historical flags